Gints is a given name. Notable people with the given name include:

Gints Bude (born 1971), Latvian fashion designer 
Gints Freimanis (born 1985), Latvian footballer
Gints Gabrāns (born 1970), Latvian artist
Gints Gilis (born 1970), Latvian footballer
Gints Meija (born 1987), Latvian ice hockey player

Latvian masculine given names